Regina Ilyinichna Spektor (born February 18, 1980) is a Russian–born American singer, songwriter, and pianist.

After self-releasing her first three records and gaining popularity in New York City's independent music scenes, particularly the anti-folk scene centered on New York City's East Village, Spektor signed with Sire Records in 2004 and began achieving greater mainstream recognition. After giving her third album a major label re-release, Sire released Spektor's fourth album, Begin to Hope, which achieved a Gold certification by the RIAA. Her following two albums, Far and What We Saw from the Cheap Seats, each debuted at number 3 on the Billboard 200. 2016's Remember Us to Life peaked at 23 on the Billboard 200.

Mayor Bill de Blasio proclaimed June 11, 2019, Regina Spektor Day in New York City. Spektor was also inducted into the Bronx Walk of Fame on May 18, 2019, by Borough President Rubén Díaz Jr.

Early life and musical beginnings
Spektor was born in 1980 in Moscow, Soviet Union, to a musical Russian-Jewish family. Her father, Ilya Spektor, was a photographer and amateur violinist. Her mother, Bella Spektor, was a music professor in a Soviet college of music and teaches at a public elementary school in Mount Vernon, New York. Spektor has a brother, Boruch (also known as Bear), who was featured in track 7, "* * *", or "Whisper", of her 2004 album Soviet Kitsch. Growing up in Moscow, Regina started taking piano lessons when she was seven and learned how to play the piano by practicing on a Petrof upright that her grandfather gave her mother. She grew up listening to classical music and Russian bards like Vladimir Vysotsky and Bulat Okudzhava. Her father, who obtained recordings in Eastern Europe and traded cassettes with friends in the Soviet Union, also exposed her to rock and roll bands such as the Beatles, Queen, and the Moody Blues.

The family left the Soviet Union for the Bronx in 1989, when Spektor was nine and a half, during the period of Perestroika, when Soviet citizens were permitted to emigrate. She had to leave her piano behind. The seriousness of her piano studies led her parents to consider not leaving the Soviet Union, but they finally decided to emigrate due to the racial, ethnic, and political discrimination that Jewish people faced.
Traveling first to Austria and then Italy, the Spektor family was admitted to the United States as refugees with the assistance of HIAS (the Hebrew Immigrant Aid Society). They settled in the Bronx, where Spektor graduated from SAR Academy, a Jewish day middle school in the Riverdale section of the Bronx. Since the family had been unable to bring their piano from Moscow, Spektor practiced on tabletops and other hard surfaces until she found a piano to play in the basement of her synagogue. In New York City, Spektor studied classical piano with Sonia Vargas, a professor at the Manhattan School of Music, until she was 17; Spektor's father had met Vargas through Vargas' husband, violinist Samuel Marder. Spektor attended high school for two years at the Frisch School, a yeshiva in Paramus, New Jersey, but transferred to a public school, Fair Lawn High School, in Fair Lawn, New Jersey, where she finished the last two years of her high school education.

Spektor was originally interested in classical music only, but she later grew interested in hip hop, rock, and punk as well. Although she had always made up songs around the house, she first became interested in more formal songwriting during a visit to Israel with the Nesiya Institute in her teenage years when she attracted attention from the other children on the trip for the songs she made up while hiking.

Following this trip, Spektor was exposed to the works of Joni Mitchell, Ani DiFranco, and other singer-songwriters, which encouraged her belief that she could create her own songs. She wrote her first a cappella songs around the age of 16 and her first songs for voice and piano when she was 17.

Spektor completed the four-year studio composition program of the Conservatory of Music at Purchase College within three years, graduating with honors in 2001. Around this time, she also worked briefly at a butterfly farm in Luck, Wisconsin, and studied in Tottenham (in North London) for one term.

Career

2001–2005: Career beginnings and Soviet Kitsch
Spektor gradually achieved recognition through performances in the anti-folk scene in downtown New York City, most prominently at the East Village's SideWalk Cafe. She also performed at local colleges (such as Sarah Lawrence College) with other musicians, including the Trachtenburg Family Slideshow Players. She sold self-published CDs at her performances during this period: 11:11 (2001) and Songs (2002). Spektor's first nationwide tour was accompanying The Strokes as the opening act on their 2003–2004 Room on Fire tour which included performances at The Theater at Madison Square Garden. While on the tour, she and the band performed and recorded "Modern Girls & Old Fashion Men". After the tour, Kings of Leon, who were the second opening act on the tour, invited Spektor to open for them on their own European tour. In 2004, Spektor signed a contract with Warner Brothers' record label Sire Records to publish and distribute her third album Soviet Kitsch, originally self-released in 2003. In 2005, she began making her first TV appearances including guest spots on various late-night talk shows.

In June 2005, Spektor was the opening act for the English piano rock band Keane on their North American tour, during which she performed at Radio City Music Hall on June 7, 2005.

2006–2008: Begin to Hope

Spektor went on to release the album Begin to Hope on June 13, 2006. The album debuted at number 70 on the Billboard 200, but due to the popularity of the single "Fidelity", it went on to peak at number 20, and was certified Gold by the RIAA. Spektor received increased attention when her video for "Fidelity" was viewed over 200,000 times in two days on YouTube. Spektor's 2006 headlining tour in support of the Begin to Hope album included back-to-back hometown shows at Town Hall Theater in New York City on September 27 and September 28, 2006. This tour was Spektor's first to feature a full backing band.

Listeners of Sirius Radio's Left of Center channel voted her single "Fidelity" as the No. 1 song of 2006. Towards the end of 2006, VH1 showcased her as part of its "You Oughta Know: Artists on the Rise" featurettes, playing clips from the "Fidelity" music video and showing parts of an interview with Spektor during commercial breaks on the channel. Spektor's video for "Fidelity" reached No. 3 on VH1's Top 20 Countdown. Spektor reached No. 33 on Blender magazine's top 100 of 2006 and was also listed as one of the "Hottest Women of Rock". On January 21, 2007, she was given an extensive feature on CBS News Sunday Morning which showcased her musical beginnings and growing popularity.

In 2007, Spektor began performing at several major music festivals including Coachella Valley Music and Arts Festival, Bonnaroo Music Festival, Lollapalooza, Virgin Festival, and Austin City Limits Music Festival. On October 1, 2007, her video for "Better" was released on VH1 and YouTube, where it received more than 100,000 views within the first 24 hours. Spektor performed acoustic at Neil Young's Bridge School Benefit at Shoreline Amphitheatre on October 27, 2007.

On November 14, 2007, at her concert at Ryman Auditorium in Nashville, Spektor collapsed during the sound check and was taken to a local emergency room. According to the statement given to the audience, Spektor was fine, but doctors said that she could not perform that night. It was later reported that the cause of the collapse was an inner ear infection which caused intense vertigo. The show was initially rescheduled for December 6, 2007, but the date was once again rescheduled, and the concert finally occurred on February 29, 2008. After her initial collapse in Nashville, she was able to perform in concerts at Mountain Stage, in West Virginia, on November 18, 2007 (the concert was aired in September 2008), and at Duke University on November 19, 2007.

Spektor wrote the song "The Call" for the 2008 film The Chronicles of Narnia: Prince Caspian, which appeared prominently in the film's finale sequence. She then appeared as a guest vocalist on "You Don't Know Me", a single from Ben Folds' 2008 album, Way to Normal. In promotion for the single, the duo performed the song together on several late-night talk shows.

2009–2011: Far
Spektor's fifth album, Far, was released June 23, 2009. For the record she worked with four producers: David Kahne (who had previously worked with Spektor on Begin to Hope), Mike Elizondo, Jacknife Lee, and Jeff Lynne. The record sold 50,000 copies in its first week, entering the US Billboard 200 at number three; the record remained on the chart for 19 weeks. The album peaked at number 30 and 16 in the UK and Canada, respectively. She then headlined at Serpentine Sessions, a series of concerts at London's Hyde Park on June 29, 2009. Other European performances in 2009 included Glastonbury Festival, Hultsfred Festival, Oxegen 2009, T in the Park, Paradiso, Latitude Festival, and Rock Werchter. Spektor invited Brooklyn-based rock band Jupiter One to open concerts on her 2009 North American tour. As a part of that tour, on October 14, 2009, Spektor headlined a concert at Radio City Music Hall in NYC. On September 16, 2009, it was announced that Spektor would write the music for the musical Beauty, a modern adaptation of the fairy tale Sleeping Beauty, which was initially set to open during the 2011–12 Broadway season. Regina made her Saturday Night Live debut on October 10, 2009, performing "Eet" and "The Calculation" off of Far.

In May 2010, Spektor performed for Barack and Michelle Obama along with hundreds of other guests at the White House reception in honor of Jewish American Heritage Month. She performed "Us" and "The Sword & the Pen".

2012–2015: What We Saw from the Cheap Seats
Spektor's sixth album, What We Saw from the Cheap Seats, was released May 29, 2012. Like her previous album, it debuted at number three on the Billboard 200. Promotional appearances for the record included Spektor appearing on the June 7, 2012 episode of The Colbert Report where she performed "Small Town Moon" as well as "Ballad of a Politician" as online bonus content. Her world tour in support of What We Saw from the Cheap Seats included a performance in Moscow; Spektor had not returned since leaving with her family in 1989.

In 2012, Spektor was named an official "Steinway Artist"; she plays Steinway & Sons pianos almost exclusively.

Spektor wrote and recorded the main title theme song, "You've Got Time", for the Netflix original series Orange Is the New Black, which premiered in July 2013. It was nominated in the Best Song Written for Visual Media category at the 56th Annual Grammy Awards.

2016–2021: Remember Us to Life
Spektor announced her seventh album, Remember Us to Life on July 21, 2016, through her email newsletter. The album was released on September 30, 2016. The first single, "Bleeding Heart", was released July 22, 2016. The follow-up single, "Small Bill$", was released August 11, 2016. Regina Spektor performed George Harrison's "While My Guitar Gently Weeps", released August 5, 2016, for the film Kubo and the Two Strings.

In 2016, Spektor was one of the artists featured on The Hamilton Mixtape; she sings a remix of "Dear Theodosia" with Ben Folds.

In 2017, Spektor was featured as a guest singer on the title track to Gypsy-punk band Gogol Bordello's studio album Seekers and Finders. Spektor was also featured as a guest vocalist on Odesza's song "Just A Memory" from their album A Moment Apart.

On November 8, 2018, Spektor released a new song entitled "Birdsong", written specially for an episode of the Amazon Prime series The Romanoffs.

On March 25, 2019, Spektor announced she would be bringing her music to Broadway as the Artist in Residency at the Lunt-Fontanne Theatre for five performances June 20–26, 2019.

On July 26, 2019, Spektor released an acoustic version of her own song "You've Got Time", coinciding with the release of the seventh and final season of Orange Is the New Black. The song is featured in the final episode of the series.

In late 2019, Spektor released a new song, "Walking Away", for Amazon Prime Original Series Modern Love.

2022–Present: Home, before and after
On February 22, 2022, Spektor announced her eighth studio album Home, before and after with a June 24 release date, alongside the release of the album's lead single "Becoming All Alone". Recorded in upstate New York, the album was produced by Spektor and John Congleton.

She performed an NPR Tiny Desk Concert on 5 August 2022, including "Becoming All Alone" from her new album as well as tunes from past releases such as "Fidelity" and "Samson".

Voice and style

Spektor's primary instrument is the piano, and she plays the guitar as a secondary instrument, primarily playing on a seafoam Epiphone Wildkat archtop hollow-body electric guitar for live performances.
Spektor has said that she has created a great number of songs but rarely writes any of them down. Spektor's songs are not usually autobiographical but are based on scenarios and characters drawn from her imagination. Her songs show influences from folk, punk, rock, Jewish, Russian, hip hop, jazz, and classical music. Spektor has said that she works hard to ensure that each of her songs has its own musical style, rather than trying to develop a distinctive style for her music as a whole: "It doesn't feel natural for me to write some diary type song. I want to write a classic like "Yesterday" but weird songs about meatballs in refrigerators come into my head – I can't help it."

Spektor performs using a broad vocal range, with a falsetto extension, but without any apparent break. She explores a variety of different and somewhat unorthodox vocal techniques, such as verses composed entirely of buzzing noises made with the lips and beatbox-style flourishes in the middle of ballads, and also makes use of such unusual musical techniques as using a drum stick to tap rhythms on the body of a chair. Part of her style also results from the exaggeration of certain aspects of vocalization, most notably the glottal stop, prominent in the single "Fidelity". She also uses a strong New York accent on some words, which she has said is due to her love of New York and its culture.

Spektor usually sings in English, though she sometimes includes a few words or verses of Latin, Russian, French, or other languages. She plays with pronunciations, which she told NPR was a remnant of her early years when she listened to pop in English without understanding the lyrics.

Her lyrics are equally eclectic, often taking the form of abstract narratives or first-person character studies, similar to short stories or vignettes put to song. Some of Spektor's lyrics include literary allusions, such as: F. Scott Fitzgerald and Ernest Hemingway in "Poor Little Rich Boy"; The Little Prince in "Baobabs"; Virginia Woolf and Margaret Atwood in "Paris"; Ezra Pound and The Merchant of Venice in "Pound of Flesh"; Boris Pasternak in "Après Moi"; Samson and Delilah in "Samson"; Oedipus Rex in "Oedipus"; Edith Wharton's Ethan Frome in "2.99¢ Blues". Recurring themes and topics in Spektor's lyrics include love, death, religion (particularly biblical and Jewish references), city life (particularly New York references), and certain key phrases which recur in different songs, such as references to gravediggers, the Tree of Knowledge of Good and Evil, and the name "Mary Ann". Spektor's use of satire is evident in "Wasteside", which refers to The Twelve Chairs, the classic satirical novel by the Soviet authors Ilf and Petrov, and describes the town in which people are born, get their hair cut, and then are sent to the cemetery.

Spektor's first album, 11:11, was recorded and self-released while she was still in college. It differs from Spektor's later releases as she was heavily influenced by blues and jazz at the time of its recording. Her second album, Songs, was recorded on Christmas Day, 2001. Each song was recorded with just one take and is entirely acoustic. The session from which the album was derived was not originally intended as an album recording session. Her third album, Soviet Kitsch, featured strings on several songs and was her first to feature a full rock band. Upon signing with a major label – which provided a bigger budget for production and studio time – Spektor began to emphasise production and more prominently use traditional pop and rock instruments.

Spektor says the records that most impact her are those of "bands whose music is really involved". She cites the Beatles, Bob Dylan, Nirvana, Madonna, Eminem, Kate Bush, Rufus Wainwright, David Bowie, the Ramones, Patti Smith, Billie Holiday, Radiohead, Tom Waits, and Frédéric Chopin as prime influences.

British singer Kate Nash said, "I related to her because she's a woman who plays the piano and writes imaginative songs. I've played the piano since I was about seven but I'd never seen it as an instrument for pop music. Regina Spektor made the piano cool… I love the fact that her accent shines through. When I started making music, it inspired me to sing the way I talk, because that's what's real."

Appearances in the media 
 
Since 2005, Spektor's music has been used in various television programs and commercials.

 In late 2005, "Us" (from Soviet Kitsch) was used in a commercial as part of the What Do You Want To Watch? series for the United Kingdom's British Sky Broadcasting, and in the summer of 2006, a clip from the same song was used for the teaser website for Microsoft's Zune project at ComingZune.com, as well as for a promotional campaign for MtvU, and by Dutch telecom company KPN in a commercial.
 "Somedays" was used in a 2005 episode of CSI: NY and "Samson" was used in a 2006 episode of the same series. 
 "On the Radio" was used in an episode of ABC's Grey's Anatomy and more recently, Netflix's Sex Education.
 "Field Below" was used in a 2006 episode (titled "The Last Word") of CBS's Criminal Minds.
 "Music Box" has been used in a commercial for JC Penney.
 "That Time" can be heard playing in the background of the 2008 indie drama In Bruges.
 "Fidelity" has been used in an episode of Grey's Anatomy (titled "Six Days, Part 2"), on Veronica Mars ("Wichita Linebacker"), on Brothers & Sisters, in the trailer for the 2007 film 27 Dresses, in the Brazilian telenovela A Favorita, and during the end credits of Love & Other Drugs (2010). "Fidelity" was also used in a 2007 Yahoo!Xtra television commercial in New Zealand.
 In 2007, the mobile phone company Vodafone used her lyric, "Come into my world", from the track "Hotel Song" in an extensive TV advertising campaign in the UK and Ireland. It also was used in ITV's Secret Diary of a Call Girl.
 "Better" was used in a commercial for XM Satellite Radio, an episode of How I Met Your Mother, the series finale of The Good Wife, and the 2009 film My Sister's Keeper.
 Spektor sang the title song "Little Boxes" of Showtime's television series Weeds in the episode "Mile Deep and a Foot Wide" (2006) and her "Ghost of Corporate Future" was used both at the beginning and end of the episode. 
 "Us" and "Hero" are both featured on the soundtrack for the 2009 film (500) Days of Summer. In August 2009, the song "Two Birds" was used in the 2009 Fall Campaign of the Polish TV station TVN. "Eet" debuted on the show 90210 in April 2010.
 On his 2010 release Scratch My Back, Peter Gabriel recorded a version of the song "Après Moi" from Begin to Hope.
 The song "Human of the Year" featured prominently in the trailer and first episode of the 2011 HBO series Enlightened, and "Hotel Song" was featured in the opening of the 2011 movie Friends with Kids.
 The title of the song "Don't Leave Me (Ne Me Quitte Pas)" and the cover of What We Saw from the Cheap Seats was featured on the display of the 5th generation iPod Touch in promotional content from Apple in late 2012. "Don't Leave Me (Ne Me Quitte Pas)" was used at the end of the episode "Five Miles From Yetzer Hara" from the eighth season of Weeds.
 The website Consequence of Sound takes its name from the Spektor song "Consequence of Sounds".
 "All the Rowboats" was featured on The CW's Ringer in March 2012. 
 The song "Your Honor" was used in the Season 2 premiere of HBO's series Girls on January 13, 2013.
 "Laughing With" was featured on BBC drama The Crash in March 2013 as well as in HBO's The Leftovers in November 2015.
 Regina wrote and recorded "You've Got Time" to be the theme song for the Netflix original series Orange is the New Black which premiered in 2013. Spektor was approached by the show's creator, Jenji Kohan, to create the opening number.
 Spektor's cover of "While My Guitar Gently Weeps", performed on a shamisen, was featured on the soundtrack of the 2016 animated film Kubo and the Two Strings. 
 Spektor's cover of "And Your Bird Can Sing" was the feature of episode 21 of Beat Bugs.
 A cover of "Us" is performed in the 2017 film Something Like Summer.
 Spektor wrote and recorded "Birdsong" featuring guitarist Atticus McKittrick for Amazon's The Romanoffs.
 Spektor wrote and recorded "Walking Away" for Amazon's Modern Love.
 Spektor wrote and recorded "One Little Soldier" for the 2019 film Bombshell.
 "The Call" featured in "Prince Caspian", the second film in the "Chronicles of Narnia" series.
 Spektor performed her song "Prisoners" featuring dancer Caleb Teicher for the 957th episode of The Late Show with Stephen Colbert.

Personal life
Spektor is fluent in Russian and reads Hebrew. She has paid tribute to her Russian heritage, quoting the poem "February" by the Russian poet Boris Pasternak in her song "Après Moi", and stating, "I'm very connected to the language and the culture."

Spektor and her family did not return home to Moscow until July 2012, when she toured through Russia in support of her sixth album, What We Saw from the Cheap Seats. She has stated that she used to be vegetarian, though stopped this after touring with The Strokes, who frequently dined on steak.

Spektor married singer-songwriter Jack Dishel in 2011. Formerly a guitarist with the band The Moldy Peaches, Dishel performs as Only Son, and duets with Spektor in the song "Call Them Brothers". They have two children.

In a 2016 interview on NPR, "Regina Spektor: 'I see my family…In Everybody'", Spektor discusses the experiences and struggles as an immigrant youth in New York have had in contributing to the album Remember Us to Life.

Philanthropy
In 2007, Spektor covered John Lennon's "Real Love" for Instant Karma: The Amnesty International Campaign to Save Darfur. The following year, she participated in Songs for Tibet, an initiative in support of human rights in Tibet and the 14th Dalai Lama. The album was issued on August 5, 2008, via iTunes and on August 19 in music stores around the world. On January 22, 2009, Spektor performed at the third annual Roe on the Rocks gig at the Bowery Ballroom to raise money for Planned Parenthood New York City.
 Also, continuing with her support for Tibet, Regina Spektor played for Tibet House's annual concert at Carnegie Hall on February 26, 2010. Less than one month later, on March 23, 2010, Spektor gave a concert at the Fillmore at Irving Plaza in New York City to raise funds for the work of Médecins Sans Frontières in Haiti. Also, on April 27, she released a cover of Radiohead's song "No Surprises", for which all proceeds went to Médecins Sans Frontières to help earthquake victims in Haiti and Chile. In February 2012, Spektor did a benefit concert at Rose Hall for HIAS (a beneficiary agency of UJA-Federation of New York), an organization that helped a young Spektor and her family emigrate from the Soviet Union. Spektor also has taken part in several memorial and benefit concerts for the family of Dan Cho, her former cellist who died while on tour with her in 2010.

Discography

 11:11 (2001)
 Songs (2002)
 Soviet Kitsch (2004)
 Mary Ann Meets the Gravediggers and Other Short Stories  (2006)
 Begin to Hope (2006)
 Far (2009)
 What We Saw from the Cheap Seats (2012)
 Remember Us to Life (2016)
 Home, Before and After (2022)

Awards and nominations
MVPA Awards

|-
| rowspan="3" | 2006
| rowspan="3" | "Us"
| Best Director of New Artist 
| 
|-
| Best Directional Debut
| 
|-
| Best Animated Video 
| 
|-
| rowspan="2" | 2007
| rowspan="2" | "Fidelity"
| Best Director of a Female Artist 
| 
|-
| Best Adult Contemporary Video 
| 
|-
| 2008
| "Better"
| Best Alternative Video
| 

Other awards

2019 Bronx Walk of Fame

References

External links

"Stories in Song: Regina Spektor's 'Begin to Hope'". Interview on All Things Considered, NPR, 28 June 2006
"Regina Spektor", by Katie Cook (Strangers Almanac column, Volume 27), Glide Magazine, 1 July 2009
  (MP3 audio download linked from archived copy)

1980 births
Living people
American women singer-songwriters
American mezzo-sopranos
American people of Russian-Jewish descent
Activists from New York (state)
American folk-pop singers
Guitarists from New Jersey
Guitarists from New York City
Frisch School alumni
Jewish American musicians
Jewish singers
Musicians from Moscow
Musicians from the Bronx
Fair Lawn High School alumni
People from Fair Lawn, New Jersey
Russian emigrants to the United States
Russian women musicians
Singers from New York City
Sire Records artists
Soviet emigrants to the United States
Soviet Jews
State University of New York at Purchase alumni
Russian Jews
Russian expatriates in Austria
Russian expatriates in Italy
Jewish anti-folk musicians
Jewish jazz musicians
Women rock singers
Singer-songwriters from New York (state)
Women punk rock singers
American LGBT rights activists
Russian LGBT rights activists
Jazz musicians from New York (state)
21st-century American guitarists
Singer-songwriters from New Jersey
21st-century American women singers
21st-century American women pianists
21st-century American pianists
21st-century American singers
21st-century American women guitarists
21st-century American Jews